This is a historical timeline of the development and progress of cancer treatments, which includes time of discovery, progress, and approval of the treatments.

Ancient Era
Cancer was traditionally treated with surgery, heat, or herbal (chemical) therapies.

 2600 BC  Egyptian physician Imhotep recommended producing a localised infection to promote regression of tumours. According to the Ebers medical papyrus, this was done by placing a poultice near the tumour, followed by local incision.
 BC  Ancient Greeks, Romans, and Egyptians used heat to treat masses. Healers in ancient India used regional and whole-body hyperthermia as treatments.
 2 AD  Ancient Greeks describe surgical treatment of cancer.

Modern Era

1800s

 1820s  British Dr. James Arnott, "the father of modern cryosurgery", starts to use cryotherapy to freeze tumours in the treatment of breast and uterine cancers
 1880s  American Dr. William Stewart Halsted develops radical mastectomy for breast cancer
 1890s  German Dr. Westermark used localized hyperthermia to produce tumour regression in patients
 1891  American Dr. William B. Coley, "the father of immunotherapy", starts to treat cancer patients by injecting them with streptococci, containing immunostimulatory CpG motifs
 1896  French Dr. Victor Despeignes, "the father of radiation therapy", starts to use X-rays to treat cancer
 1896  American Dr. Emil Grubbe starts to treat breast cancer patients with X-rays
 1896 Sir George Thomas Beatson invented hormonal treatment of breast cancer by bilateral ovary removal in women with inoperable breast cancer.

1900s
 1900  Swedish Dr. Stenbeck cures a skin cancer with small doses of radiation
 1920s  Dr. William B. Coley's immunotherapy treatment, regressed tumors in hundreds of cases, the success of Coley's Toxins attracted heavy resistance from his rival and supervisor, Dr. James Ewing, who was an ardent supporter of radiation therapy for cancer. This rivalry and opposition to Dr. Coley leads to the disuse of immunotherapy for cancer, in favor of Dr. Ewing's preferred radiation therapy
 1939  American Dr. Charles Huggins uses synthetic hormone therapy to treat prostate cancer
 1942  First chemotherapy drug mustine used to treat cancer 
 1947  American Dr. Sidney Farber induces brief remission in a patient with leukaemia with the antifolate drug aminopterin (methotrexate)
 1949  US FDA approves mechlorethamine, a nitrogen mustard compound, for treatment of cancer
 1949  Oncolytic viruses began human clinical trials
 1951  Dr. Jane C. Wright demonstrated the use of the antifolate, methotrexate in solid tumors, showing remission in breast cancer
 1950s  Anti-cancer anthracyclines isolated from the Streptomyces peucetius bacteria. Anthracycline-based derivatives include: daunorubicin, doxorubicin, amrubicin, idarubicin
 1953   US FDA approves Mercaptopurine (6 MP), an immunosuppressive agent
 1956  Metastatic choriocarcinoma cancer is cured with the antifolate, methotrexate
 1956  First bone marrow transplantation performed by E. Donnall Thomas in order to treat leukemia in one of two identical twins, the healthy twin being the donor 
 1957  Introduction of fluorouracil to treat colorectal, breast, stomach, and pancreatic cancers
 1957  Introduction of interferon to treat kidney, skin, and bladder cancer
 1958  Combination therapy consisting of 6-mercaptopurine and methotrexate results in a cure of leukaemia in a trial run in US hospitals
 1958  US FDA approves cyclophosphamide for chemotherapy of cancer
 1960s  Introduction of laser therapy in treatment of cancer
 1960  Invention of tamoxifen breast cancer anti-estrogen (SERM) hormonal therapy drug
 1961  Vincristine, anti-cancer alkaloid, isolated from the Madagascar periwinkle plant 
 1962  US FDA disapproves Dr. Coley's immunotherapy, making it illegal; radiation therapy remained the dominant treatment for cancer
 1963  US FDA approves vincristine (Oncovin) for chemotherapy of cancer
 1964  VAMP regimen combination therapy, consisting of: vincristine, amethopterin, 6-mercaptopurine, and prednisone, induces long-term remissions in juvenile acute lymphoblastic leukemia
 1965  MOPP regimen combination therapy cures advanced Hodgkin's lymphoma, with the combination of: nitrogen mustard, vincristine, procarbazine, and prednisone
 1965  MOMP regimen combination therapy, consisting of: methotrexate, vincristine, 6-MP, and prednisone, induces long-term remissions in juvenile acute lymphoblastic leukemia
 1965  Latvian scientist Aina Muceniece identifies echovirus as a potential agent for oncolytic virotherapy, resulting in the development of RIGVIR
 1966  Taxol, anti-cancer compound, isolated from the yew plant
 1967  Camptothecin, anti-cancer compound, isolated from the Camptotheca acuminata, the Chinese Happy Tree, which was used as a cancer treatment in traditional Chinese medicine. It is the source of chemotherapy drugs: topotecan and irinotecan.
 1968  Japanese Dr. Tanaka pioneers the treatment of metastatic breast cancer with cryoablation, resulting in prolonged survival
 1972  UK and other European countries approve tamoxifen for breast cancer
 1972  American Dr. Lawrence Einhorn cures metastatic testicular cancer with cisplatin
 1975  Invention of monoclonal antibodies
 1975  American Dr. Einhorn shows combination therapy consisting of cisplatinum, vinblastine, and bleomycin can cure 70% of advanced testicular cancer cases
 1975  C-MOPP regimen combination therapy, consisting of: methotrexate, vincristine, cyclophosphamide, and prednisone, cured advanced diffuse large B-cell lymphoma
 1977  US FDA approves tamoxifen for metastatic breast cancer only, not widely popular as chemotherapy remains first line of treatment
 1981  American Dr. Bernard Fisher proves lumpectomy is as effective as mastectomy for breast cancer
 1989  US FDA approves Carboplatin, a derivative of cisplatin, for chemotherapy
 1990  US FDA approves tamoxifen for major additional use to help prevent the recurrence of cancer in "node-negative" patients 
 1990  China begins treating various cancers with photodynamic therapy
 1991  First gene therapy treatment of cancer (melanoma)
 1992  Invention of tyrosine-kinase inhibitor Imatinib 
 1992  Invention of Etacstil breast cancer anti-estrogen (SERM/SERD) hormonal therapy drug that overcomes hormone-therapy resistance 
 1996  US FDA approves antiestrogen, aromatase inhibitor Anastrozole for advanced breast cancer
 1996  Russia begins treating various cancers with photodynamic therapy
 1997  First monoclonal antibody, Rituximab, is licensed
 1997  Chinese doctors start treating uterine fibroids, liver cancer, breast cancer, pancreatic cancer, bone tumours, and renal cancer with ultrasound imaging-guided High-intensity focused ultrasound
 1998  Chinese doctors start treating breast, kidney, lung, liver, prostate and bone cancer with imaging-guided cryoablation
 1998  US FDA approves herceptin, a monoclonal antibody for HER2 metastatic breast cancer
 1998  US FDA approves cryoablation for the treatment of prostate cancer 
 1998  US FDA approves Camptothecin-analogue irinotecan for chemotherapy of cancer
 1998  US FDA approves tamoxifen to reduce breast cancer risk in high-risk patients
 1998  US FDA approves monoclonal antibody, Trastuzumab for advanced HER-2 breast cancer
 1998  Imaging-guided High-intensity focused ultrasound is approved for use in Europe for treatment of cancer

2000s
 2001  UK NICE approves taxol for chemotherapy of breast, ovarian, and non-small cell lung cancers 
 2002  US FDA approves imatinib
 2002  The State Food and Drug Administration of China approves Gendicine, gene therapy for cancer
 2002  Corporate takeover of Dupont by BMS resulted in abandoning Etacstil breast cancer anti-estrogen (SERM/SERD) hormonal therapy drug that overcomes hormone-therapy resistance
 2003  American Dr. Peter Littrup starts to treat early and metastatic breast cancer with cryoablation
 2004  bevacizumab, the first approved drug to inhibit blood vessel formation by tumours, is licensed
 2005  US FDA approves taxol for chemotherapy of breast, pancreatic, and non-small cell lung cancers
 2006  US FDA approves herceptin
 2007  US FDA approves sorafenib
 2007  US FDA approves camptothecin-analogue topotecan for chemotherapy of cancer
 2010  US FDA approves immunotherapy, sipuleucel-T dendritic cell vaccine for advanced prostate cancer
 2010  China advances cryoimmunotherapy to treat breast, kidney, lung, liver, prostate and bone cancer
 2011  US FDA approves monoclonal antibody, Ipilimumab for advanced melanoma
 2011  Cuba develops and releases CimaVax-EGF, the first therapeutic cancer vaccine for lung cancer
 2012  Cuba develops and releases monoclonal antibody, Racotumomab, the therapeutic cancer vaccine for lung cancer
 2015  US FDA approves anti-CDK4/6, Palbociclib for advanced breast cancer
 2015  US FDA approves imaging-guided High-intensity focused ultrasound for prostate cancer

See also 
 Treatment of cancer
 History of cancer chemotherapy

References

External links 
 The Rise And Fall Of Modern Medicine
 The Evolution of Drug Discovery: From Traditional Medicines to Modern Drugs
 Chemotherapy
 Treatment of Solid Tumor Cancers with the Chemotherapy Drug Methotrexate

Therapy
Cancer
Treatment Development